Bratislava V is an okres (district) of Bratislava in the Bratislava Region of Slovakia. It covers southern areas of Bratislava, including the boroughs of Petržalka, Jarovce, Rusovce and Čunovo. It is bordered by the Danube river to the north and east, which forms its borders with the Bratislava IV, Bratislava I, Bratislava II and Senec districts. It borders on Hungary in the south and Austria in the west. Until 1920, the northern part of the district was part of the Hungarian county of Pozsony, while the southern part was part of the county of Moson. It is the only Slovak district which is situated on the right bank of the Danube.

 

Boroughs of Bratislava
Districts of Slovakia
Geography of Bratislava Region